Børge Bommelund Christensen (4 November 1931 – 13 December 2014) was a Danish footballer. He played in three matches for the Denmark national football team from 1954 to 1956.

References

External links
 

1931 births
2014 deaths
Danish men's footballers
Denmark international footballers
Footballers from Copenhagen
Association football midfielders
Boldklubben af 1893 players